Kenya Airways was established by the Government of Kenya on 22 January 1977, following the collapse of the East African Union and the consequent folding of East African Airways. It first flew on 4 February 1977 servicing the London–Nairobi route with a Boeing 707–321 leased from British Midland Airways. A year later, the airline network comprised five domestic and 16 international destinations. At July 1980, the airline's international network consisted of Addis Ababa, Athens, Bombay, Cairo, Copenhagen, Frankfurt, Jeddah, Kampala, Karachi, Khartoum, London, Lusaka, Mauritius, Mogadishu, Rome, Salisbury, Seychelles and Zurich; four Kenyan cities (Kisumu, Malindi, Mombasa and Mumias) were also served.

In , the carrier announced the suspension of services to Rome and Muscat as part of cost-cutting measures following a 50% fall in profit for FY2011/12. In July 2016, the route to Livingstone, Zambia was extended to Cape Town, South Africa. , Kenya Airways served 54 destinations, 44 of them in Africa.

In October 2018, Kenya Airways became the fifth African airline to serve the US market when a route to New York–JFK was inaugurated.

List
The following are current and former Kenya Airways' scheduled destinations, .

Footnotes

References

External links
 
 

Lists of airline destinations
Kenya Airways
SkyTeam destinations